Nahuel Mariano Yeri (born 12 September 1991) is an Argentine professional footballer who plays as a midfielder for Círculo Deportivo.

Career
Yeri's senior career began in 2010 with Primera División side Banfield. On 7 February, in the 2009–10 season, Yeri made his Banfield debut in a 2–1 defeat against Chacarita Juniors. Three months later he made his second appearance for Banfield, versus Huracán. In 2010–11, the following season, he again made two appearances. For 2011–12, Yeri didn't make an appearance for Banfield as he was loaned out to Primera B Nacional club Deportivo Merlo. Twenty-seven appearances followed before he returned to Banfield, who were relegated to the division Yeri had just played in.

In Argentina's second tier, Yeri made sixteen appearances and scored three goals, but it wasn't enough as Banfield missed out on promotion by eight points. Yeri featured heavily in the following season, 2013–14, as he made thirty-six appearances in Banfield's promotion-winning campaign as they won the Primera B Nacional title. One goal in forty-one games came in the next three seasons for Yeri in the top-flight before he left Banfield as he joined fellow Primera División team Aldosivi in 2016. His first match for the club came on 30 August versus Colón. He played seventeen times in his debut season as Aldosivi suffered relegation.

Career statistics
.

Honours
Banfield
Primera B Nacional: 2013–14

Aldosivi
Primera B Nacional: 2017–18

References

External links

1991 births
Living people
Sportspeople from Mar del Plata
Argentine footballers
Association football midfielders
Argentine Primera División players
Primera Nacional players
Club Atlético Banfield footballers
Deportivo Merlo footballers
Aldosivi footballers